Michael Aislabie Denham (1801 – 10 September 1859) was an English merchant and collector of folklore.

Life
A native of Gainford, County Durham, Denham was in business at Kingston-upon-Hull in the early part of his life. Ultimately he settled as a general merchant at Piercebridge, near Gainford, where he died on 10 September 1859.

Works
Denham collected local lore. His works were:

 A Collection of Proverbs and Popular Sayings relating to the Seasons, the Weather, and Agricultural Pursuits, gathered chiefly from oral tradition, London, 1846, printed by the Percy Society. 
 The Slogans, and War and Gathering Cries of the North of England, 1850, and with additions, Newcastle upon Tyne, 1851.
 A Collection of Bishoprick Rhymes, Proverbs, and Sayings, to which he afterwards added four tracts of the same kind, completing the last about 1858. 
 Cumberland Rhymes, Proverbs, and Sayings, in four parts, the last of which appeared in 1854. 
 A similar work relating to Westmorland, in two parts, 1858.
 Roman Imperial Gold Coin, a description of a coin of the Emperor Maximus [Durham (?) 1856], under the pseudonym "Archæus". 
 Folklore of the North, in six parts, the last appearing in 1856. 
 Folklore, or a Collection of Local Rhymes, Proverbs, Sayings, Prophecies, Slogans, &c., relating to Northumberland, Newcastle-on-Tyne, and Berwick-on-Tweed; Richmond, Yorkshire, 1858. Limited to fifty copies. 
 Minor Tracts on Folklore, to the number of twenty, starting about 1849 and ending about 1854. 
 A Classified Catalogue of the Antiquarian Tomes, Tracts, and Trifles, referring to the works Denham had edited himself, 1859.

References

Attribution

1800s births
Date of birth missing
1859 deaths
English merchants
English folklorists
People from Gainford, County Durham
19th-century English businesspeople